Scaphytopius is a genus of leafhoppers in the family Cicadellidae. There are at least 170 described species in Scaphytopius.

See also
 List of Scaphytopius species

References

Further reading

External links

 

Scaphytopiini
Cicadellidae genera